Roy Marsden (born Roy Anthony Mould; 25 June 1941) is an English actor who portrayed Adam Dalgliesh in the Anglia Television dramatisations (1983–1998) of P. D. James's detective novels, and Neil Burnside in the spy drama The Sandbaggers (1979–1980).

Education 
Marsden attended the Royal Academy of Dramatic Art (RADA) and spent four terms there. He attempted to unionise the students but was thwarted. After one argument he poured a bottle of ink down the front of the director's suit. Marsden recalled, "Two weeks later, he phoned me up and asked if I'd got a job or an agent. I said no, so he arranged for me to start work at a theatre in Nottingham, and who should be the student assistant manager there but Anthony Hopkins. I persuaded him to go to RADA."

Stage 
In the early 1960s, Marsden worked with the Royal Shakespeare Company and began to accumulate an extensive list of theatrical credits that include everything from Anton Chekhov and Henrik Ibsen to contemporary Soviet playwright Alexander Vampilov. His preference was for the alternative experimental theatres of Glasgow, Edinburgh, Cambridge and Birmingham over London's commercial theatre.

His appearances include Crispen in The Friends, 1970; Casca and Lucilius in Julius Caesar, 1972; Paul Schippel in Schippel, 1974; Heinrich Krey in The Plumber's Progress, 1975. He also played Long John Silver in Treasure Island at London's Mermaid Theatre around Christmas for two years and Henry Higgins in Pygmalion at the Albery Theatre. In 2008, Marsden appeared in two productions, Murder on Air and Happy Jack at the Theatre Royal, Windsor.

Television 
His prominent television roles include George Osborne in a 1967 adaptation of Vanity Fair and the title role of Arthur Chipping in 1984's Goodbye Mr. Chips. Marsden has also appeared in guest roles in episodes of The New Avengers (episode "The Tale of the Big Why"), Space: 1999, Only Fools and Horses (episode "Little Problems"), and Tales of the Unexpected (episode "Proof of Guilt").

Marsden starred in Yorkshire Television's 1978–1980 Cold War espionage series The Sandbaggers. He played Neil Burnside, the dour and fiercely protective director of operations for the Secret Intelligence Service, whose character spent as much time infighting with his superiors in Whitehall and his own department as he did battling the KGB. The show ran for three series and 20 episodes.

In 1982, Yorkshire Television cast him in Airline, a series in which he played Jack Ruskin, a scrappy Second World War pilot trying to start his own post-war airline against establishment opposition. It also starred his wife, Polly Hemingway, who was pregnant with their first child during most of the filming. In an interview, Marsden said "It was one of the most enjoyable programmes I ever made. Learning to fly those old DC-3s was terrific. And I enjoyed playing Ruskin enormously because he had hope. Of course, he was a pain up the tushie most of the time, but then you'd see that youthful desire to actually get out and triumph against enormous odds. I identified with that character the most."

Marsden's portrayal of Adam Dalgliesh in Anglia TV's P. D. James series spanned fifteen years. The series began as adaptations played out in serials of five or six one-hour episodes each, which were, unusually for the time, recorded on outside broadcast videotape as opposed to film:

Death of an Expert Witness (1983);
Shroud for a Nightingale (1984);
Cover Her Face (1985);
The Black Tower (1985);
A Taste for Death (1988);
Devices and Desires (1991).

After producer John Rosenberg died in early 1991 (during the transmission run of Devices and Desires), the format of the adaptations changed. Initially, Anglia followed the trend made popular by the Inspector Morse series, condensing the next two adaptations into two-hour filmed TV films.

Unnatural Causes (1993);
A Mind to Murder (1995).

The final two adaptations were filmed in three one-hour episodes:

Original Sin (1997);
A Certain Justice (1998).

The Dalgliesh role was taken by Martin Shaw when the BBC took over the rights to James's novels and produced its own series.

In 1993, Marsden appeared in The Last Vampyre, a feature-length episode of Sherlock Holmes.

In 2006 he played Ted Cartwright, a veterinarian, in "Bad Blood", in the fourth season of Foyle's War.

Marsden presented a nine-part crime documentary series Roy Marsden's Casebook for ITV West in 2007. He also appeared in the 2007 Doctor Who episode "Smith and Jones" as Mr Stoker, a medical consultant.

In 2008, he appeared in the ITV series The Palace as King Richard's private secretary, Sir Iain Ratalick. That same year he played Sir Charles Marlow in the television film adaptation She Stoops to Conquer; Polly Hemingway appeared in the film as Mrs. Hardcastle, the first time the two formerly married actors had appeared in the same production since 1982's Arline. 

Marsden reprised his Only Fools and Horses role in 2009 as one of the Driscoll brothers in the spin-off series, The Green Green Grass. He also appeared in the television film Margaret (2009) as Norman Tebbit.

In 2010 Marsden appeared in an episode of New Tricks, and in 2011 in an episode of Silent Witness.

He played Commander Haydock in the 2016 adaptation of Agatha Christie's N or M?, a three-episode part of the BBC's Partners in Crime serial.

Film 
His film credits include Toomorrow (1970), a small part as a Gestapo officer in The Eagle Has Landed (1976), The Squeeze (1977), and Oberon in Dungeons & Dragons: Wrath of the Dragon God (2005).

Personal life 
Marsden's birth name is Roy Anthony Mould; Roy Marsden was his stage name until April 2005, when it also became his legal name.

Marsden's second wife was actress Polly Hemingway; they had two sons together before their divorce in 1992.

References

External links 
 
 

1941 births
Alumni of RADA
English male film actors
English male television actors
People from Stepney
Living people
20th-century English male actors
21st-century English male actors